Seizure may refer to:

Arts, entertainment, and media
 Seizure (album), a 1989 album by New Zealand musician Chris Knox
 Seizure (Cook novel), a 2003 novel by Robin Cook
 Seizure (film), a 1974 film by Oliver Stone
 Seizure (journal), a peer-reviewed journal covering epilepsy
 Seizure (Reichs novel), a 2011 novel by Kathy Reichs
 "Seizure", a [[Law & Order: Criminal Intent (season 1)|season 1 episode of Law & Order: Criminal Intent]]
 Seizures (album), a 2009 studio album by Kisschasy

Law
 Descriptive seizure (also called "Anton Piller order" in the UK and "saisie-contrefaçon" in France), a court order to search premises and seize and/or describe evidence without prior warning
 Search and seizure, the legal removal of property

Medicine
Convulsion, a synonym for seizure
Epileptic seizure, caused by abnormal, rhythmic discharges of cortical neurons
Non-epileptic seizure, which mimics epileptic seizure but has a different cause

Other uses
 Seizure, the act of a communications circuit going off-hook